Arntgolts is a surname. Notable people with the surname include:

Albert Arntgolts (born 1937), Russian actor, father of below
Olga Arntgolts (born 1982), Russian actress, twin sister of Tatyana
Tatyana Arntgolts (born 1982), Russian actress, twin sister of Olga